Jerzy Rybicki (born 6 June 1953 in Warsaw) is a retired boxer from Poland, who represented his country at the 1976 Summer Olympics in Montréal, Quebec, Canada. There he won the gold medal in the light middleweight division (– 71 kg), after having defeated Yugoslavia's Tadija Kačar in the final.

Four years later, when Moscow hosted the Games, Rybicki won the bronze medal in the middleweight category (– 75 kg). He did the same in 1978 at the second World Championships in Belgrade.

Olympic results
Montreal - 1976
 Round of 32: bye
 Round of 16: Defeated Charles Walker (United States) by decision, 3–2
 Quarterfinal: Defeated Wilfredo Guzman (Puerto Rico) by decision, 5–0
 Semifinal: Defeated Viktor Savchenko (Soviet Union) by decision, 3–2
 Final: Defeated Tadija Kačar (Yugoslavia) by decision, 5–0 (won gold medal)

Moscow - 1980
 Round of 32: bye
 Round of 16: Defeated Tarmo Uusivirta (Finland) referee stopped contest in the second round
 Quarterfinal: Defeated Peter Odhiambo (Uganda) by decision, 5–0
 Semifinal: Lost to Viktor Savchenko (Soviet Union) stopped in 3rd round due to eye injury (was awarded bronze medal)

References

External links
 databaseOlympics.com

1953 births
Living people
AIBA World Boxing Championships medalists
Boxers at the 1976 Summer Olympics
Boxers at the 1980 Summer Olympics
Boxers from Warsaw
Light-middleweight boxers
Medalists at the 1976 Summer Olympics
Medalists at the 1980 Summer Olympics
Olympic boxers of Poland
Olympic bronze medalists for Poland
Olympic gold medalists for Poland
Olympic medalists in boxing
Polish male boxers